Indonesia participated in the 1986 Asian Games held in Seoul, South Korea from September 20, 1986 to October 5, 1986. This country was ranked ninth with 1 gold medal, 5 silver medals and 14 bronze medals with a total of 20 medals top.

Medal summary

Medal table

Medalists

References

Nations at the 1986 Asian Games
1986